Sophie Fillières (born 20 November 1964) is a French film director and screenwriter who has written for more than fifteen film and television productions since 1991.

Filmography

References

External links

1964 births
Living people
French film directors
French women film directors
Writers from Paris
French women screenwriters
French screenwriters